Sorkh Dom-e Laki (also Romanized as Sorkh Dom-e Lakī; also known as Dom Sorkh Lakī) is a village in Kuhdasht-e Shomali Rural District, in the Central District of Kuhdasht County, Lorestan Province, Iran. At the 2006 census, its population was 90, in 16 families.

References 

Towns and villages in Kuhdasht County